Sikukia gudgeri is the scientific name for a freshwater fish of the family Cyprinidae that is found in Thailand.

Habitat 
They were found in freshwater.

Dispersion 
The area of dispersion are Chao Phraya River Basin and Mekong River Basin.

Utilization 
They were used for Fishery: Trade.

References 

Cyprinid fish of Asia
Fish of Thailand
Fish described in 1934